
Gmina Juchnowiec Kościelny is a rural gmina (administrative district) in Białystok County, Podlaskie Voivodeship, in north-eastern Poland.

Villages
Gmina Juchnowiec Kościelny contains the villages and settlements of Baranki, Biele, Bogdanki, Bronczany, Czerewki, Dorożki, Hermanówka, Hołówki Duże, Hołówki Małe, Horodniany, Hryniewicze, Ignatki, Ignatki-Kolonia, Izabelin, Janowicze, Janowicze-Kolonia, Juchnowiec Dolny, Juchnowiec Dolny-Kolonia, Juchnowiec Górny, Juchnowiec Kościelny, Kleosin, Klewinowo, Kojrany, Kolonia Koplany, Kolonia Księżyno, Koplany, Kożany, Kozowszczyzna, Księżyno, Lewickie, Lewickie-Kolonia, Lewickie-Stacja, Mańkowizna, Niewodnica Nargilewska, Niewodnica Nargilewska-Kolonia, Ogrodniczki, Olmonty, Pańki, Rostołty, Rumejki, Simuny, Solniczki, Śródlesie, Stanisławowo, Szerenosy, Tryczówka, Wojszki, Wólka, Zajączki, Zaleskie and Złotniki.

Neighbouring gminas
Gmina Juchnowiec Kościelny is bordered by the city of Białystok and by the gminas of Bielsk Podlaski, Choroszcz, Suraż, Turośń Kościelna, Wyszki and Zabłudów.

References
Polish official population figures 2006

Juchnowiec Koscielny
Białystok County